Steve Schlachter (סטיב שלכטר; born June 30, 1954) is an American-Israeli former basketball player. He played the forward and center positions. 
He competed for 16 seasons in the Israel Basketball Premier League, and played for the Israeli national basketball team.

Biography

Schlachter's hometown is Plymouth Meeting, Pennsylvania, and he is Jewish. Schlachter is 6' 9" (206 cm) tall, and weighs 240 pounds.

He attended Plymouth-Whitemarsh High School.

Schlachter then attended the University of Delaware. He played for the Delaware Fightin' Blue Hens in 1973-76. He made aliyah, becoming an Israeli citizen.

He played 16 seasons in the Israel Basketball Premier League. Schlachter competed between 1977 and 1995 for Israeli teams Hapoel Ramat Gan, Maccabi Haifa, and Bnei Herzliya Basket.

Schlachter played for the Israeli national basketball team. He competed for it in the 
1981 FIBA European Championship for Men, 1983 FIBA European Championship for Men, and 1985 FIBA European Championship for Men.

References 

1954 births
Living people
Israeli men's basketball players
American men's basketball players
Delaware Fightin' Blue Hens men's basketball players
Maccabi Haifa B.C. players
Israeli Basketball Premier League players
Sportspeople from Montgomery County, Pennsylvania
Basketball players from Pennsylvania
Jewish men's basketball players
Jewish American sportspeople
Jewish Israeli sportspeople
Israeli people of American-Jewish descent
21st-century American Jews